Douglas Lennox-Silva (born April 10, 1987 in Fort Lauderdale, Florida) is a male butterfly swimmer from Puerto Rico, who was born in the United States. He represented Puerto Rico at the 2008 Summer Olympics in Beijing, PR China. He is the younger brother of Kristina Lennox-Silva, who also competed as a swimmer at the 2008 Summer Olympics.

Doug attended Princeton University majoring in anthropology with certificates in American Studies and Latin American Studies.

References
 

1987 births
Living people
Male butterfly swimmers
Puerto Rican male swimmers
Swimmers at the 2008 Summer Olympics
Olympic swimmers of Puerto Rico
Sportspeople from Fort Lauderdale, Florida